Bargoed Rugby Football Club is a rugby union team from the town of Bargoed in South Wales. They are members of the Welsh Rugby Union and are a feeder club for Nzewport Gwent Dragons. The club holds the record for the number of points achieved in one season at Championship level and are Currently playing in the Championship after being relegated from the premiership at the end of the 2018 - 2019 season.

Bargoed got their hands on another Championship League trophy in 2022 and narrowly lost to Neath RFC in the Championship Cup Final at the Principality Stadium

In 2005 Bargoed RFC received the recognition of being awarded Rugby World Magazine UK team of the year after winning 55 games in a row. This form helped them climb the leagues and they were crowned Championship Champions. In December 2015 the WRU granted Bargoed an A Licence meaning a top four finish would secure Premiership rugby for the first time which was achieved in 2016–17.

The 2016–17 season was the club's first in the Premiership.

The club has 16 Teams within the club, including teams from the Mini and Junior Section, a Youth Side, 2nd Team and 1st Team. The club has produced many talented players who came up through the club development system. Some of these key players are : Anthony Lott, Steffan Jones, Jonathan Evans, Dafydd Carter (Age Grade International), Grant Rogers (Age Grade International), Alex Herbert (Age Grade International) as of many more.

Notable past players
See also :Category:Bargoed RFC players
  John Mantle (2 caps)
  Cliff Williams (2 caps)
  Steffan Jones (Bedford Blues)
  Jonathan Evans
  Lee Beach
  Ben Fry (rugby union)

References

Rugby clubs established in 1882
Welsh rugby union teams
Bargoed